Benigno Ramos: Bounty Hunter is an adventure story arc of the Philippine comic strip series Pugad Baboy, created by Pol Medina, Jr. and originally published in the Philippine Daily Inquirer from July to October 2005. In 2006, the story arc was republished in the Pugad Baboy Sunday Comics compilation. Since the Sunday comic strips included in the compilation were originally in color, in contrast to the black-and-white strips of previous compilations, this story arc has the distinction of being the first to be reprinted in full color. It is also the first story arc to feature Igno as a major character.

Synopsis
Igno is hired by the brothers Ang, Alexander and Napoleon, to find Rudolf Cruz, who owes them a large debt. The brothers agree to pay Igno Php 400,000 for his efforts. Igno shows the Angs his proficiency for turning any object into a deadly weapon by using a sheet of coupon bond to give the brothers' bodyguard a paper cut.

Background investigation
Igno consults his cousin Tomas, who gives him tips on how to find and capture Rudolf Cruz. However, the shoe-shine boy (Polgas) polishing Tomas' boots, who also happens to be a notary public, suggests that Igno better check on the brothers' background first since Cruz had not been charged with any crime.

Igno takes the shoe-shine boy's suggestion and discovers that the Ang brothers are Chinese immigrants who chose the names of famous emperors because they believed they were the descendants of a Chinese emperor. They used to engage in the import-export industry, but later invested as financiers of a casino.

Igno's capture and escape
After the background check, Igno decides to nab Rudolf Cruz. He locates Cruz betting in an off-track betting facility in Bulacan. Against the advice of Tomas, Igno arrests Rudolf roughly and out in the open. Igno calls the Ang brothers, telling them he has captured Cruz and asks for police assistance. Police indeed appear during the conversation and suddenly take both Igno and Cruz into custody.

However, instead of being put behind bars, the two are tied up and detained in a warehouse. Rudolf Cruz tells Igno that the police who detained them were the same characters who had been watching his every move and that they nabbed Igno as well, thinking that he was helping Rudolf escape Bulacan. During the conversation, Igno splits a paint can lid and uses a half's sharp edge to cut the rope binding his arms. He then rips off the bottom of the paint can and makes two improvised shuriken.

Igno then picks the lock on the door and catches their guard's attention. As the guard reaches for his rifle, Igno throws the two shuriken at him, hitting him squarely on the cheeks. The guard even quips that by the time his puncture wounds heal, he would have dimples like those of actor Aga Muhlach. For this reason, the two call the guard from that point onwards, "Dimples."

After Igno and Rudolf escape, Igno tracks down and retrieves his cellphone from a pawnshop, where the policemen who had confiscated it had pawned it. He shows Rudolf the picture of the Ang brothers and after receiving a text message telling him to proceed to a warehouse where they would meet, he sends a short classified ad to a tabloid called "Bought and Sold" (a spoof of the classified ads newspaper Buy & Sell).

While spending the night in a forested area, Rudolf reveals to Igno that he was an accountant in Caesar's Casino, owned by a pair of Bulaqueños who do not want to have their identities revealed. The said brothers, Rudolf explains, are also running the illegal numbers game jueteng. The brothers want Rudolf to be taken down because he knows much about their operation. Rudolf decided to take out life insurance, steal money, and hide somewhere safe. Rudolf also shows Igno a bullet from a .45 ACP sent to him as a threat.

Another confrontation
The next day, Igno and Rudolf are having some snacks in the warehouse where they were waiting for the Ang brothers. Rudolf is puzzled to see Igno purposely not finishing his ears of corn and turning his barbecue skewers into small arrows. Igno goes out to meet the policemen who are supposed to take Rudolf away. However, Igno spots "Dimples" in the driver's seat of the police car, and he begins throwing his improvised weapons at the officers. Igno and Rudolf manage to escape the warehouse after the ping-pong balls which were stored inside were set afire in the ensuing commotion. 

Once outside, a goon hacks at Igno with a bolo knife, but Igno catches the blow on his metal bracelets. Another goon aims a pistol at him, but Igno tosses an alley cat at the bad guy. The animal proceeds to scratch at the poor fellow. The duo made good their escape and hid out in Rudolf's kubo (a native bamboo and thatch hut). Monitoring the police channel via the radio he had taken from one of the goons, Igno listens to reports regarding the activities of Los Kosas Muntinlupas, a notorious group of former inmates of the New Bilibid Prisons. This, he reasons, would distract the crooked cops enough to afford them the opportunity to get out of Bulacan.

Igno and Rudolf leave the hut and took a jeepney, but before reaching a police checkpoint, they got off. Igno then prepares to tangle with the responding cops as he knew the jeepney driver would disclose their presence to the policemen at the checkpoint. Two cops in a motorized tricycle show up and Igno disables them, taking the trike. Using the vehicle, he dupes Dimples into thinking that they were trying to escape. He gives chase, but falls into Igno's trap and is taken captive. Igno forces him to drive to the Ang brothers' house.

The Angs' true identity
Igno and Rudolf gain access to the house by a clever ruse of exchanging Dimples' and Igno's attire. Igno manages to subdue the younger Ang as Rudolf covers the rest of the goons; Rudolf also makes the observation that this was not the Alex Ang that he worked for. At this point, Nap, the elder brother, makes an appearance. Taking Rudolf hostage, he forces Igno to release Alex. 

Igno and Rudolf are then taken to the warehouse again and tied up. Rudolf is threatened with Igno's necklacing should he not reveal the whereabouts of the money he took from the Angs. Rudolf then reveals that he had the money converted to treasury bills and had hidden these in his person. Alex retrieves the T-bills and then thoroughly washes his hands, fearing he might be contaminated with Rudolf's "queerness."

Nap then reveals their true identities; they were in reality, not the Ang brothers. They were jueteng operators who had gone to Thailand as medical tourists with the intent of having their appearances changed to resemble the Angs. They had coerced the Angs in swapping identities with them in order to throw the authorities off their track.

Endgame
Nap then orders one of his goons to light up the tire around Igno's neck; Igno however, took the opportunity of the lit lighter in his face to belch a flammable cloud of alcohol-laden breath to set the goon's torso aflame. Nap then threatens to shoot Rudolf, but Igno places himself between the two, shielding Rudolf from harm. Before Nap could pull the trigger, flaming cans of shoe polish strike him and his goons. Polgas, in the guise of The Polisher (a spoof of The Punisher) has arrived to the rescue. He tells everyone that the police were on the way. 

Taking advantage of the distraction created by a brief scuffle between Igno and the Angs' bodyguard, Nap pulls out a derringer and aims it at Igno. A shot is heard, and Nap finds a bleeding hole in his gut; Rudolf has fashioned an improvised weapon out of the  water pipes from a kitchen sink and had effectively used the bullet mailed to him by Nap as a threat. 

The police arrive and take the bad guys away.

Epilogue
The true Ang brothers get their identities back, and the jueteng lords are in the midst of defending themselves in court. Igno's record is also clean; he is no longer "Wanted" in Bulacan. Igno takes Tomas out to Rudolf's hut, intending to tear down the structure and transport it home, as Rudolf had bequeathed this to him as a reward. They soon notice that the bamboo posts in the hut had small holes in them. Upon closer inspection, they discover that all the posts in the hut were filled with loose change. Using the money retrieved from the hut, Tomas buys new guns for his collection and Igno gets himself a pickup truck and a new house. However, he reveals in the next strip that the cash he and Tomas found were only enough for the house, gun collection, and truck and thus, as part of the strip's punch line, asks Mao for an IOU.

Notes about the arc
Benigno Ramos: Bounty Hunter is the first story arc to feature Igno, who was first introduced in 1998, as a lead character. His only other appearance is as a minor character in Private Investigator!.
In a scene occurring after the jueteng lords' arrest, Polgas reveals to Igno yet another of his disguises: The Publisher (yet another spoof of the Punisher). He describes himself as publishing the works of Pol Medina, Jr. while holding a copy of Pugad Baboy 18, an in-joke to the fact that Pol Medina publishes his own work under his company Pol Medina Jr. Novelties. And his main disguise, The Polisher, is due to his sideline as a shoe shiner.
This story arc introduces Pugad Baboy's version of The Punisher's skull symbol used for the Polisher and Publisher guises: a Polgas-shaped skull instead of a human's.
The Los Kosas Muntinlupas, appearing briefly in the story arc, are supposed friends of Igno during his incarceration in Bilibid. They appeared on the covers of Disi-Sais! (Pugad Baboy 16), 18 (Pugad Baboy 18) and the back cover of Pugad Baboy 19 but merely as stock characters. They are later introduced properly in Pugad Baboy XX, in a minor arc devoted to them and Igno. Their names are given as Wakali (has a mole on his nose), Lino (the skinny member), and Don (bald with a moustache). 
The necklacing is a method of execution in which a vehicle tire was worn around a victim then set it ablaze.
Paper cut was a shallow cut or wound due to a thin and sharp object. While glass cut was defenestration or any person who broke glasses/glass panels with their body.

Pugad Baboy